Events from the year 1974 in Denmark.

Incumbents
 Monarch - Margrethe II
 Prime minister - Poul Hartling

Events

Undated

Sports
 14–20 August  Peder Pedersen wins gold in Men's sprint at the 1974 UCI Track Cycling World Championships.

Births
March 7 – Jeppe Nielsen, freestyle swimmer
March 15 – Claus Jørgensen, race walker
 June 12 – Jesper Just, visual artist
October 2 – Bjarke Ingels, architect
 31 October - Natasja Saad, rapper and reggae singer (dead 2007)
December 24 – Thure Lindhardt, actor

Deaths
2 June – Tom Kristensen, poet, novelist, critic (born 1893)

See also
1974 in Danish television

References

 
Denmark
Years of the 20th century in Denmark
1970s in Denmark